Montevideo, God Bless You! (internationally titled Montevideo, Taste of a Dream) is a 2010 Serbian film directed by Dragan Bjelogrlić about the events leading to the participation of the Yugoslavia national football team at the first FIFA World Cup in Montevideo, Uruguay in July 1930. The film gained considerable media attention throughout 2010 and achieved significant box office success in Serbia since its release on December 21, 2010. The entire project has been hugely successful regionally thus far. More than 520,000 people in Serbia saw the first film, which won numerous awards.

The story is loosely based on the novel Montevideo, Bog te video by the prominent Serbian sports journalist Vladimir Stanković. He drew inspiration to write a romanticized depiction of the late 1920s Serbia and the events that popularized the game of football in the country after having watched the American film The Game of Their Lives.

The film was awarded the 'Audience Choice Award' for Best Film in the main competition program at the 33rd Moscow International Film Festival. It was also Serbia's official submission for Best Foreign Language Film at the 84th Academy Awards, but did not make the final shortlist.

A sequel, See You in Montevideo, was released on January 14, 2014.

Part of the movie was filmed in the city of La Laguna, Tenerife.

Plot
In 1930 Belgrade, Yugoslavia, eleven passionate, mostly anonymous but very talented soccer players and their journey from the cobblestone streets of impoverished Belgrade neighborhoods to the formation of the national team before the very first World Cup in faraway Uruguay. So far away that the country's capital, Montevideo, seems more a distant dream than a familiar reality. Named after the city where the inaugural World Cup was held, director Dragan Bjelogrlić's adaptation of journalist Vladimir Stanković's best-selling book centers on the relationship between the two top players: natural talent and poor boy Tirke (Miloš Biković) and playboy superstar Moša (Petar Strugar).

The two young men eventually become friends when they're thrown together on the front line of the dominant local team, BSK Belgrade. As the club hierarchy is faced with the challenge of keeping the squad afloat, the opportunity arises to create a national team. However, team unity is strained when Tirke and Moša clash over beautiful women. Rosa (Danina Jeftić), the voluptuous, small-town innocent who adores Tirke, but her soccer-mad uncle conspires to set her up with Moša; and vampish Valeria (Nina Janković), a rich flapper who seduces Moša and finds much fun in pitting him against Tirke. The initial doubt that surrounded their personal and professional lives is transformed into a shared ambition to prove themselves in Montevideo; as a result, a story about friendship, enthusiasm, persistence and love for the game is unraveled.

Cast
 Miloš Biković as Aleksandar "Tirke" Tirnanić
 Petar Strugar as Blagoje "Moša" Marjanović
 Nina Janković as Valerija, an eccentric Belgrade artist and painter, who hangs out among Belgrade's elite.
 Danina Jeftić as Rosa, Tirke's love interest, who works at her uncle Rajko's tavern.
 Mima Karadžić as Rajko, owner of the local tavern.
 Branimir Brstina as Bogdan Brica
 Vojin Ćetković as Mihajlo "Andrejka" Andrejević
 Nebojša Ilić as Boško "Dunster" Simonović, who becomes the national team's coach later in the film.
 Nikola Ðuričko as Živković
 Sergej Trifunović as Načelnik Komatina
 Viktor Savić as Milutin "Milutinac" Ivković,
 Predrag Vasić as Little Stanoje, a shoeshine boy, he considers himself as Tirke's best friend, and he lives in poor conditions and has a leg deformity.
 Srđan Todorović as Bora Jovanović
 Boda Ninković as Kustodić
 Anita Mančić as Đurđa
 Marko Živić as Isak
 Aleksandar Radojčić as Milorad "Balerina" Arsenijević
 Uroš Jovicić as Đorđe "Ðokica Nosonja" Vujadinović
 Bojan Krivokapić as Momčilo "Gusar" Đokić
 Andrija Kuzmanović as Milovan "Jakša" Jakšić
 Ivan Zekić as Ivan "Ivica" Bek
 Nenad Heraković as Dragoslav "Vampir" Mihajlović
 Aleksandar Filimonović as Ljubiša "Leo" Stevanović
 Rade Ćosić as Teofilo Spasojević
 Milan Nikitović as Branislav "Bane" Sekulić
 Tamara Dragićević as Eli
 Branislav Lečić as King Alexander

Accolades

DVD and TV series
The movie was released on DVD during 2011.

On 1 January 2012 it was broadcast on RTS1, achieving stellar ratings with over 3.1 million viewers.

The extended version of the film, including 5 hours of footage unseen in the theatrical cut, began to be broadcast as the eponymous television series on RTS starting 13 February 2012, and onwards weekly every Monday in the 8pm prime time slot. Nine episodes aired, with the first season concluding on 9 April 2012.

The second series, titled Na putu za Montevideo, (season two) began on 31 December 2012, this time airing Sundays. The plot now moved to the preparations for the long trip to Uruguay. Nine more episodes were shown concluding on 10 March 2013.

In July 2013, the first series began airing in Croatia on RTL Televizija.

On 3 August 2013, Montevideo, God Bless You!, aired on the Chinese CCTV-6 network.

On 15 January 2014, the sequel feature film Montevideo, vidimo se! got released in theaters.

See also
 List of submissions to the 84th Academy Awards for Best Foreign Language Film
 List of Serbian submissions for the Academy Award for Best Foreign Language Film

References

External links
 
 

2010 films
2010s Serbian-language films
Serbian sports comedy films
Films based on non-fiction books
Films set in 1930
Sports films based on actual events
Films set in Serbia
Films set in Belgrade
Films set in Yugoslavia
Films set in Uruguay
Films set in Montevideo
1930 FIFA World Cup
Association football films
History of Serbia on film
2010s sports comedy films
2010 comedy films
Films shot in Belgrade
Cultural depictions of Serbian men
Cultural depictions of Alexander I of Yugoslavia